B4 is a national highway of Namibia.

The B4 crosses the Sperrgebiet, an area restricted for diamond mining along the coast of the Atlantic, between Aus and Lüderitz. Travellers may leave the road only at demarcated places. It also forms the southern border of the Namib-Naukluft National Park.

References

Roads in Namibia
Buildings and structures in ǁKaras Region
Namib-Naukluft National Park